The England cricket team toured India from 11 November 1981 to 4 February 1982 and played 6 Test matches.

India won the Test series 1-0.

Test matches

1st Test

2nd Test

3rd Test

4th Test

5th Test

6th Test

One Day Internationals (ODIs)

India won the Wills Series 2-1.

1st ODI

2nd ODI

3rd ODI

References

External links
 Cricarchive
 Tour page CricInfo
 Record CricInfo

1981 in English cricket
1981 in Indian cricket
1982 in English cricket
1982 in Indian cricket
1981-82
Indian cricket seasons from 1970–71 to 1999–2000
International cricket competitions from 1980–81 to 1985